is a passenger railway station  located in the town of  Kotoura, Tottori Prefecture, Japan. It is operated by the West Japan Railway Company (JR West).

Lines

Station layout
The station consists of two ground-level opposed side platforms connected by a level crossing to the station building. The station is unattended.

Platforms

History
It was renamed  on August 20, 1938, and became Urayasu Station on December 15, 1949. With the privatization of the Japan National Railways (JNR) on April 1, 1987, the station came under the aegis of the West Japan Railway Company.

Passenger statistics
In fiscal 2018, the station was used by an average of 762 passengers daily.

Surrounding area
Kotoura Town Hall
Kotoura Town Lifelong Learning Center "Manabi Town Tohaku"
Kotoura Town Library Main Building
Kotoura Municipal Tohaku Junior High School

See also
List of railway stations in Japan

References

External links 

 Urayasu Station from JR-Odekake.net 

Railway stations in Tottori Prefecture
Stations of West Japan Railway Company
Sanin Main Line
Railway stations in Japan opened in 1903
Kotoura, Tottori